FC Zavodchanin Saratov was a Russian football team from Saratov. It played professionally in 1995 and 1996. Their best result was 17th place in Zone Centre of the Russian Second League in 1996.

External links
  Team history at KLISF

Association football clubs established in 1995
Association football clubs disestablished in 1997
Defunct football clubs in Russia
Sport in Saratov
1995 establishments in Russia
1997 disestablishments in Russia